The El Salvador women's national basketball team is controlled by the Federación Salvadoreña de Baloncesto (FESABAL) and represents El Salvador in international competitions.

FIBA AmeriCup record
 2021 – 9th place

Team

Current roster
Roster for the 2021 FIBA Women's AmeriCup.

Head coaches
  Ray Santana (2017–)

References

External links
FIBA profile
Latinbasket.com 

Basketball in El Salvador
Women's national basketball teams
Basketball
1956 establishments in El Salvador